Jamie Watt (born 11 January 1994) is a Dutch-Scottish football player. He most recently played for Helmond Sport.

Club career
He made his professional debut in the Eerste Divisie for Helmond Sport on 12 September 2014 in a game against FC Emmen.

References

External links
 
 

1994 births
Footballers from Dundee
Dutch people of Scottish descent
Living people
Dutch footballers
Helmond Sport players
Eerste Divisie players
Association football goalkeepers